The 2nd Texas Cavalry Regiment was a unit of mounted volunteers from Texas that fought in the Confederate States Army during the American Civil War. The unit was organized in May 1861 as the 2nd Texas Mounted Rifles. In early 1862, the regiment took part in the unsuccessful New Mexico Campaign before retreating to Texas. In April 1862 the unit reorganized at Austin, Texas, as the 2nd Texas Cavalry. In January 1863, part of the regiment helped recapture Galveston while another part was captured at Arkansas Post. After moving to Louisiana, the unit fought at LaFourche Crossing, Second Donaldsonville, Kock's Plantation, Sterling's Plantation, and Bayou Bourbeux. It returned to Texas in winter 1863 and remained there until the surrender in June 1865.

See also
List of Texas Civil War Confederate units

Notes

References

Units and formations of the Confederate States Army from Texas
1861 establishments in Texas
1865 disestablishments in Texas
Military units and formations disestablished in 1865
Military units and formations established in 1861